2016 Regional League Division 2 Eastern  Region is the 8th season of the League competition since its establishment in 2009. It is in the third tier of the Thai football league system.

Changes from Last Season

Break zone Clubs

Nakhon Nayok, Prachinburi United, Kabin United, Sa Kaeo, Marines Maptaphut, Chanthaburi and Samut Prakan Songsingh are broken from Central & Eastern Region

Team Changes

Promoted Clubs

Rayong were promoted to the 2016 Thai Division 1 League.

Relegated Clubs

 Trat were relegated from the 2015 Thai Division 1 League.

Renamed Clubs

 Tawee Wattana renamed Pattaya City.
 Kabin United renamed Saimitr Kabin United.
 Marines Maptaphut renamed Marines Eureka.
 Rayong United renamed Pluak Daeng Rayong United.

Relocated Clubs

Rayong United  re-located to the Regional League East Division from the Bangkok Area Division 2015.
Pathum Thani United, Royal Thai Fleet were moved to the Bangkok & Eastern Region.
Phan Thong, Saraburi TRU were moved to the Central Region.

Expansion Clubs

TA Benchamarachuthit joined the newly expanded league setup.

Stadium and locations

League table

Results

Season statistics

Top scorers
As of 4 September 2016.

See also
 2016 Thai Premier League
 2016 Thai Division 1 League
 2016 Regional League Division 2
 2016 Thai FA Cup
 2016 Thai League Cup
 2016 Kor Royal Cup

References

External links
 Division 2

Regional League Central-East Division seasons